is a Japanese football club based in Okayama, the capital of Okayama Prefecture. They play in the J2 League, the second tier of the country's football league system.

Name origin 
Fagiano in Italian means "pheasant", and it is a reference to the pheasant that was a companion of local legend character Momotarō. Their mascot Fagimaru is based on the specific species native to Japan, the green pheasant.

History 
They were formed in 1975 after the old Kawasaki Steel Mizushima F.C. moved to Kobe, who are now Vissel Kobe.

The old boys of the club formed a new club which they called the "River Free Kickers" (RFK). For years thereafter the club played in the prefectural league. In 2003, they assumed the name "Fagiano Okayama" and began rising in the ranks.

In 2005, Fagiano Okayama were promoted into the Chugoku Regional League. In July 2007, Fagiano became the first club ever to attain the J. League Associate Membership while still playing in a division below the JFL. On December 2, 2007, Fagiano gained promotion to the JFL courtesy of winning the first place in the regional playoff games.

On 2008, they secured 4th place in the last JFL match week, thereby qualifying for J. League promotion below Tochigi S.C. and Kataller Toyama; on December 1 promotion was made official by J. League and Okayama competed in J2 for the first time in 2009.

Their main sponsor is Okayama Gas and their back sponsor is the Sanyo Shinbun, a local newspaper in Okayama.

The club currently 15th consecutive season of second tier in 2023.

Stadium 
Their home stadium is City Light Stadium, in Okayama City, though some home matches are played at Tsuyama Stadium, in Tsuyama.

League and cup record 

Key

Honours 
Chugoku Football League: 2
 2006, 2007

Okayama Football League 1: 4
 1990, 2001, 2003, 2004

Okayama Football League 2: 1
 1980

Current squad 
.

Out on loan

Coaching staff 
For the 2023 season.

Managerial history 
League games only

Key
Source: J.League Data Site

Colour, sponsors and manufacturers

Kit evolution

References

External links 
 
Okayama 2014 Squad 

 
Football clubs in Japan
J.League clubs
Association football clubs established in 2004
Sport in Okayama
Sports teams in Okayama Prefecture
2004 establishments in Japan
Japan Football League clubs